Jasonia or Iasonia, also Iasonia Akropolis, was a Greek Acropolis on the Black Sea coast of ancient Pontus. It was located on Cape Jasonium.

The exact site of the place is unlocated. Plinio El Viejo also talks about a river called Jason located near another river called Melantio, between the cities of Ambiso and Farnacia.

References

Populated places in ancient Pontus
Former populated places in Turkey
History of Ordu Province